The 2017 South Sudan Football Championship (also called the 2017 South Sudan Champions League or 2017 South Sudan Premier League) was the 4th season of the South Sudan Football Championship, the top-level football championship of South Sudan. It was played between 9 and 26 November 2017.

Group stage
There were two groups, with Group A played in Juba and Group B played in Wau.

Kator FC won Group A and Wau Salaam FC won Group B.

Group A

Group B

Final
[Nov 26, Wau]

Al-Salam (Wau) 2-1 Kator FC (Juba)

References

External links
South Sudan Football Association

Football leagues in South Sudan
Premier League
South Sudan